Mampikony Airport is an airport in Mampikony, Sofia Region, Madagascar.

Airlines and destinations

References 

Airports in Madagascar
Sofia Region